The Casey House is a historic house on the Baxter County Fairgrounds in Mountain Home, Arkansas.  Still at its original location when built c. 1858, is a well-preserved local example of a dog trot house, a typical Arkansas pioneer house.  It is a rectangular structure made out of two log pens with a breezeway in between.  It is finished in clapboard siding on the outside walls, and the breezeway is finished with flushboarding.  A porch extends the width of the house front, and is sheltered by the side-gable roof that also covers the house.  Colonel Casey, its builder, was one of Mountain Home's first settlers, and its first representative in the Arkansas legislature.

The house was listed on the National Register of Historic Places in 1975.

The house was destroyed during an F3 tornado on November 18, 1985.

See also
National Register of Historic Places listings in Baxter County, Arkansas

References

Houses on the National Register of Historic Places in Arkansas
Houses completed in 1858
Houses in Baxter County, Arkansas
National Register of Historic Places in Baxter County, Arkansas
Mountain Home, Arkansas
1858 establishments in Arkansas
Dogtrot architecture in Arkansas